Həzrəoba or Khazryoba may refer to:
 Həzrəoba, Khachmaz, Azerbaijan
 Həzrəoba, Qusar, Azerbaijan